Chortiatis can refer to:

Mount Chortiatis, a mountain in Greece
Chortiatis, the town on the foot of the above mountain
The Massacre of Chortiatis, a World War II war crime